= La Horchata Zine =

La Horchata Zine is a self-published short magazine originating in Washington, D.C. by Kimberly Benavides and Veronica Melendez. As an arts publication, La Horchata Zine has produced ten editions of their "Connected Diaspora" series highlighting artists from Central America beginning in 2017. Each edition highlights artists from Central America and its global diaspora ranging in artistic mediums including poetry, photography, multi-media collages, ceramicists, sculptors and music.

== Reception ==
La Horchata has been highlighted in several museums, libraries, galleries, news segments, and academic reports. Connected Diaspora: U.S. Central American Visuality in the Age of Social Media at the Usdan Gallery and the National Museum of the American Latino's exhibition: ¡Presente! include La Horchata zine as an exhibit object. News organizations such as CBS News Baltimore and The Washington Post have spotlighted the author's rationale for the zine, referencing a lack of and need for Central American visibility in visual culture. Publicly accessible resources related to the La Horchata Zine include the DC public Library's oral history of the magazine's authors and a recent 2025 report by the North American Congress on Latin America (NACLA).
